Eskenazi is a London dealer in Chinese art and artifacts run by Giuseppe Eskenazi that opened in 1960 and moved to the current Mayfair gallery in 1993.

History 

In 1960 Giuseppe Eskenazi and his father opened office in London, to supply the art gallery in Milan which was run by his cousin Vittorio.  In 1972 Eskenazi museum was redesigned by John Prizeman.  In 1973 King Gustaf VI Adolf of Sweden visits the gallery In 1978 British Rail Tang Horse was sold to  British Rail Pension Fund for £3.4m

References

External links
 Official website

Art galleries in London
Buildings and structures in the City of Westminster
Art galleries established in 1960
1960 establishments in England